Emily Dunn may refer to:

 Emily Newton Dunn (born 1972), English TV presenter
 Emily Dunn (actress) (born 1982), American actress and dancer